The 2013–14 Princeton Tigers men's basketball team represented Princeton University during the 2013–14 NCAA Division I men's basketball season. The Tigers, led by third year head coach Mitch Henderson, played their home games at Jadwin Gymnasium and were members of the Ivy League. They finished the season 21–9, 8–6 in Ivy League play to finish in a tie for third place. They were invited to the College Basketball Invitational where they defeated Tulane in the first round before losing in the quarterfinals to Fresno State.

Awards and accomplishments
Spencer Weisz earned the 2014 Ivy League Men's Basketball Rookie of the Year Award. On December 7, 2013, he posted his first career double-double with 17 points (including 3-for-3 on three-point field goals) and 10 rebounds against Fairleigh Dickinson.

Roster

Schedule

|-
!colspan=9 style="background:#000000; color:#FF6F00;"| Regular season

|-
!colspan=9 style="background:#000000; color:#FF6F00;"| College Basketball Invitational

References

Princeton Tigers men's basketball seasons
Princeton
Princeton
Prince
Prince